Grevillea rosmarinifolia, commonly known as rosemary grevillea, is a species of flowering plant in the family Proteaceae and is endemic to south-eastern continental Australia and naturalised in other parts of the country. It is usually an erect, compact to open shrub with linear, narrowly elliptic or narrowly oblong leaves with the edges rolled under, and loose clusters of pink to red flowers.

Description

Taxonomy
Grevillea rosmarinifolia was first formally described in 1825 by Allan Cunningham, in Barron Field's book, Geographical Memoirs on New South Wales, from specimens collected on the banks of the Coxs River. The specific epithet (rosmarinifolia) means "rosemary-leaved".

In 2000, Robert Owen Makinson described two subspecies of G. rosmarinifolia, and the names are accepted by the Australian Plant Census:
 Grevillea rosmarinifolia subsp. glabella (R.Br.)

Distribution and habitat
Rosemary grevillea is native to New South Wales and Victoria, but is naturalised in South Australia and the Australian Capital Territory. Subspecies glabella grows in mallee or shrubland in sandy soils in the Rankins Springs to Griffith area of southern New South Wales and in the Little Desert area of western Victoria. Subspecies rosmarinifolia grows in open forest or woodland in montane areas of south-eastern New South Wales and in isolated areas of inland Victoria, between Gippsland, Melbourne, Skipton and the Brisbane Ranges.

Use in horticulture
This grevillea is common in cultivation and all forms are readily grown from cuttings. The type form from the Coxs River is thought to be extinct in the field, but was rediscovered by Donald McGillivray growing outside the Royal Botanic Garden Edinburgh in 1969. 
Grevillea rosmarinifolia prefers full sun. In the UK it has gained the Royal Horticultural Society’s Award of Garden Merit.

References

rosmarinifolia
Proteales of Australia
Flora of New South Wales
Flora of Victoria (Australia)
Garden plants of Australia